Nemanja Stošković (born 21 February 1990) is a Serbian football right winger who plays for Sloboda Užice.

Club career
In June 2016, Stošković extended his contract with FC Shirak, having previously signed for the club in February 2016. He left the club before new year 2017.

References

External links
 
 Nemanja Stošković stats at utakmica.rs 
 

1990 births
Living people
Sportspeople from Niš
Association football midfielders
Serbian footballers
FK Metalac Gornji Milanovac players
FK Radnički Niš players
FK Banat Zrenjanin players
FK Smederevo players
FK Sinđelić Niš players
FK Sloboda Užice players
Serbian First League players
Serbian SuperLiga players
Serbian expatriate footballers
Serbian expatriate sportspeople in Malta
Expatriate footballers in Malta
Serbian expatriate sportspeople in Armenia
Expatriate footballers in Armenia
Marsaxlokk F.C. players
Maltese Premier League players
FC Shirak players
Armenian Premier League players
FK Bregalnica Štip players